{{Speciesbox 
|image = Grevillea parvula.JPG
|image_caption = In the Royal Botanic Gardens Victoria
|genus = Grevillea
|species = parvula
|authority = Molyneux & Stajsic
|synonyms_ref = 
|synonyms = 
 Grevillea sp. 3 subsp. 1 
 Grevillea sp. 3 subsp. 2 (Mt Kaye) 
 Grevillea victoriae 'Mallacoota Inlet p.p.
 Grevillea victoriae 'race f'  p.p.
 Grevillea victoriae var. leptoneura Benth. 
}}Grevillea parvula , commonly known as Genoa grevillea, is a species of flowering plant in the family Proteaceae and is endemic to an area near the border between New South Wales and Victoria in south-eastern continental Australia. It is a spreading to erect shrub, usually with elliptic leaves, and down-turned clusters of pinkish to red flowers.

The edges of the leaves are turned down, the upper surface of the leaves smooth, the lower surface densely silky-hairy.

Taxonomy
This taxon was first formally described in 1870 as Grevillea victoriae var. leptoneura by English botanist George Bentham in the fifth volume of Flora Australiensis from specimens collected by Ferdinand von Mueller near the headwaters of the Genoa River. In 2000, Bill Molyneux and Val Stajsic raised the variety to species status as Grevillea parvula in the Flora of Australia. The specific epithet (parvula) is the diminutive form of the Latin word parvus meaning "small", referring to the size of the leaves, flowers and follicles which are smaller than those of closely related grevilleas.

It is found between Eden and the Main Range and near the Wallagaraugh and Towamba Rivers in the far south-east of New South Wales and in the far east of Victoria.

Conservation status
This species is listed as "endangered" under the Victorian Government Flora and Fauna Guarantee Act 1988 and as "Rare in Victoria" on the Department of Sustainability and Environment's Advisory List of Rare Or Threatened Plants In Victoria.

Use in horticulture
The cultivar Grevillea 'Canterbury Gold' is a hybrid between a prostrate yellow form of Grevillea juniperina'' and this species.

References

parvula
Flora of New South Wales
Flora of Victoria (Australia)
Proteales of Australia
Taxa named by George Bentham
Plants described in 1870